The siege of Hennebont of 1342 was an episode of the War of the Breton Succession. The forces of Charles of Blois kept Jeanne of Flandre in the city, while they waited for English reinforcements. The arrival of these reinforcements in June 1342 provoked the lifting of the siege.

History 
Jeanne of Flandre took refuge in Hennebont and waited for reinforcements promised by her vassal, Amaury of Clisson and the English troops. The city was besieged by the supporters of the opposing Ducal claimant, Charles of Blois. Following a trick, she succeeded in getting out of the besieged city, and travelling to Auray to find the reinforcements. They returned to Hennebont five days later, still thanks to a trick.

The siege itself continued until the arrival of English reinforcements, who penetrated Blavet (present day Port-Louis) in June.

The siege was then lifted, and the besiegers took the road to Auray to give a hand to Charles of Blois, who by then was besieging Auray.

External links 
Summary on the area of the Cultural Institute of Bretagne 

Hennebont (1342)
Hennebont (1342)
Conflicts in 1342
1342 in England
1340s in France
Military history of Brittany
History of Morbihan
War of the Breton Succession